Unsplash is a website dedicated to proprietary stock photography. Since 2021, it has been owned by Getty Images. The website claims over 265,000 contributing photographers and generates more than 16 billion photo impressions per month on their growing library of over 3.48 million photos. Unsplash has been cited as one of the world's leading photography websites by Forbes, Design Hub, CNET, Medium and The Next Web.

History 

Initially a pioneer of the copyright-free photography model, Unsplash was created in 2013 by Montreal-based entrepreneur Mikael Cho. While creating a new homepage for his company Crew, Cho was unable to find a suitable stock photo and hired a photographer instead. Afterwards, Cho posted the outtakes from his company photoshoot on Tumblr, inviting people to use them as they saw fit. Unsplash received more than 50,000 visits on its first day.

Cho supplied the first batch of photos to Unsplash, which then received contributions from amateur and professional photographers. Due to the volume of photo submissions, the site employed an editorial team and "curators" picked from the Unsplash community, including Guy Kawasaki, Nas, Khoi Vinh, Amanda Hesser and Om Malik.

In March 2021, Unsplash was acquired by Getty Images for an undisclosed sum. Unsplash will continue to operate as a standalone brand and division of Getty Images with Cho in charge.

Licensing

Unsplash photos are covered by the Unsplash license. The Unsplash license prevents users from using photos from Unsplash in a similar or competing service. While it gives downloaders the right to "copy, modify, distribute and use the photos for free, including commercial purposes, without asking permission from or providing attribution to the photographer or Unsplash", the Unsplash terms of service prohibit selling unaltered copies, including selling the photos as prints or printed on physical goods.

Initially, the permissive copyright terms on its photos led to Unsplash becoming one of the largest photography suppliers on the internet, with its members' photos frequently appearing on articles.

Before June 2017, photos uploaded to Unsplash were made available under the Creative Commons zero license, which is a public domain equivalent license and a waiver, which allowed individuals to freely reuse, repurpose and remix photos for their own projects. In June 2017, Unsplash changed the license they made their content available under to their own license, the Unsplash License, which imposes some additional restrictions.

Around 200,000 images were lost to the public domain. It was not possible to segregate or find which images had been available as CC0 prior to the license change due to restrictions on the use of Unsplash's API. At the time of the license change, Creative Commons Director Ryan Merkley asked that "[i]n order to ensure that the commons is maintained, we hope that Unsplash will either a) properly mark all the works shared using CC0 and/or b) make available a full archive of the CC0 works so they can be shared on a platform that supports open licensing". To date, Unsplash have declined to make these works reavailable or easily identifiable by machines.

In February 2018, Unsplash changed their license terms to restrict the sale of photos without first updating, modifying, or otherwise incorporating new creative elements into the photos, prohibiting selling unaltered copies, including selling the photos as prints or printed on physical goods.

In December 2019, Unsplash for Brands was launched, where advertisers can share branded images on Unsplash.

The Unsplash license is incompatible with Creative Commons licenses, meaning that content from Unsplash cannot be published under a Creative Commons license without additional permissions from the original authors. Unsplash actively prevents authors from offering their content under Creative Commons licenses, for instance by deleting references to such licenses from comments.

The lack of attribution for Unsplash photos has been the subject of controversy in photography circles, due to some companies using free Unsplash photography for profit without compensating the photographers. Unsplash itself has stated that it does not support the practice.

Using the Internet Archive, one can still find images published before June 2017 as indicated.
 Under the terms of the CC0 declaration, which states that a surrender into the public domain under CC0 is irrevocable, such images remain in the public domain forever.

Book
In 2016, while still a CC0 business, Unsplash released the Unsplash Book, the world's "first ever fully crowd-sourced" book. The book's photos, essays, and funding were all contributed by Unsplash's community. The book raised $106,000 on Kickstarter and included contributions from Harvard law professor and CC0 inventor Lawrence Lessig, and designer Tobias van Schneider.

Unsplash API
In addition to its website, Unsplash provides a public application programming interface (API) that answers more than 3.8 billion photo requests per month. Some of the products using the Unsplash API include Medium, Trello, Squarespace, CodePen, Square as well as Unsplash own series of products such as Unsplash for iOS, Unsplash Instant, an extension for Google Chrome that loads Unsplash photos in new tabs and Unsplash for Apple TV.

Unsplash Local
Beyond its website and API, Unsplash has hosted photo walks in cities around the world including Tokyo, Montreal, Toronto and Boston. The photo walks are hosted by guides from the Unsplash community who show participants the best places to take photos in their city, how to use their cameras, and how to compose better photos.

Unsplash+
Unsplash launched Unsplash+ in October 2022. An unlimited subscription for access to new content, features, and expanded legal protections. Unsplash+ also provides visual artists with unique opportunities to shoot commissioned content.

References

External links 

 

Photography websites
Companies based in Montreal
Image-sharing websites
Internet properties established in 2013
Photo archives in Canada
Stock photography
Remote companies
Getty Images
2021 mergers and acquisitions